In Mexican cuisine, cabeza (lit. 'head') is the meat from a roasted head of an animal, served as taco or burrito fillings. 

Typically, the whole head is placed on a steamer or grill, and customers may ask for particular parts of the body meats they favor, such as ojo (eye), oreja (ear), cachete (cheek), lengua (tongue), or labios (lips).

See also
 Brain (as food)
 Eggs and brains
 Fried-brain sandwich
 Maghaz
 Phospho-Energon

References

Beef
Brain dishes
Mexican cuisine
Offal